Live at Newport is a live album by the blues musician Lightnin' Hopkins, recorded at the Newport Folk Festival in 1965. Several tracks were released on three Vanguard Records compilation albums, The Great Blues Men (1971), Great Bluesmen Newport (1977), and Blues with a Feeling (1993), before the complete performance was released on CD in 2002.

Reception

AllMusic reviewer Ronnie D. Lankford Jr. wrote: "Recorded in 1965, Live at Newport captures Hopkins in a loose mood communing with an appreciative audience. The mostly solo electric set apparently didn't cause any controversy (as Dylan's electric set with the Paul Butterfield Blues Band would in 1965). The nice thing about the album is that all the material seems to have come from the same set, giving the listener a taste of what seeing Hopkins at Newport might have been like. ... Live at Newport also includes several unreleased versions, making it a good album to add to one's Hopkins collection". The Penguin Guide to Blues Recordings noted: "This amiable set from the Newport Folk Festival is stocked, as might be expected, with common pieces ... but includes long, ostensibly autobiographical 'Cotton Patch Blues'. Although Lightnin' says several times he needs to warm up his fingers, he pulls off some startling guitar runs".

Track listing
All compositions by Sam "Lightnin'" Hopkins except where noted
 Introduction by Michael Bloomfield – 0:56
 "Where Can I Find My Baby?" – 3:15
 "Baby Please Don't Go" (Traditional) – 3:16 Originally released on Blues with a Feeling
 "Mojo Hand" – 3:55
 "Trouble in Mind" (Richard M. Jones) – 2:40
 "The Woman I'm Loving, She's Taken My Appetite" – 4:01 Originally released on Blues with a Feeling
 "Come On Baby" – 2:11 Originally released on Blues with a Feeling
 "Cotton Patch Blues" – 8:34 Originally released in edited form as "Cotton Field Blues" on The Great Blues Men 
 "Instrumental" – 3:55
 "Jealous of My Wife" – 2:59
 "Every Day About This Time (Instrumental)" – 2:58
 "Shake That Thing" – 1:41 Originally released on Great Bluesmen Newport

Personnel

Performance
Lightnin' Hopkins – guitar, vocals 
Sam Lay – drums (tracks 8–12)

Production
Tom Vickers – compilation producer
Jeff Zaraya – engineer
Barry Ridge – art director
Drew Cartwright – graphic design
John Milward – liner notes
Doug Fulton, Ray Flerlage – photography

References

2002 live albums
Lightnin' Hopkins live albums
Vanguard Records live albums